The IBM ThinkPad 500 is a subnotebook from the ThinkPad series released by IBM in 1993.

History 
The ThinkPad 500 was announced on 16 June 1993. It was described as IBM's first subnotebook. The next subnotebook by IBM was the IBM ThinkPad 701 series

It was announced at the same time as the IBM ThinkPad 350.

Specifications 
It contained a 50 MHz 486SLC2 and a 85 or 170 MB HDD.

It includes an external floppy drive.

Reception 
InfoWorld regarded the ThinkPad 500 as a bit too small for comfort.

PC World awarded the ThinkPad 500 the "Best Buy - #1 Value Mobile PC" in September 1994.

Successor 
In March 1994 the ThinkPad 510 was announced, which contains the 486 DLC by IBM and a 7.7" display.

References

External links 
 Hardware Maintenance Manual
 Laptop.pics
 Thinkwiki.de - 500
 Thinkwiki.org - 500

IBM laptops
ThinkPad